Ethik in der Schauweise der Wissenschaften vom Menschen und von der Gesellschaft is a book by German sociologist and economist Leopold von Wiese which has first been published in 1947 at A. Francke AG. It contains a typology of ethics, opposing individual to social ethics. The book rounded up a bunch of Leopold von Wiese's writings "which are intrinsically linked", including Gedanken über Menschlichkeit (1915), Homo sum: Gedanken zu einer zusammenfassenden Anthropologie (1940), and, finally, die Ethik in der Schauweise der Wissenschaften vom Menschen und von der Gesellschaft.

Leopold von Wiese's Ethik is divided into a "general" and a "specific part": The first part consists of eight chapters: 1) the word "ethics", 2) a "methodological foundation", 3) a "history of ideas, the foundation", and 4) a "systematic foundation", 5) a "distinct from related display modes", 6)" Principles of individual ethics with a pathetic discourse on ethics and unemotional ", 7)" Broad social ethics, and 8) "imperatives".

References 

1947 non-fiction books
German non-fiction books
Ethics books